Lim Ji-Hye (Korean: 임지혜  ; born 28 October 1985 in Cheorwon, South Korea) is a South Korean weightlifter. She competed at the 2012 Summer Olympics in the -75 kg event.

References 

1985 births
Living people
South Korean female weightlifters
Olympic weightlifters of South Korea
Weightlifters at the 2012 Summer Olympics
Weightlifters at the 2010 Asian Games
Asian Games competitors for South Korea
20th-century South Korean women
21st-century South Korean women